Jean Dunbabin (born 1939) is an honorary fellow of St Anne's College, University of Oxford. Dunbabin specialises in medieval political communities in France c. 1000-c.1350, and in southern Italy and Sicily 1250–1310, and medieval political thought. She is a fellow of the British Academy.

Dunbabin has contributed to The Cambridge History of Later Medieval Philosophy, The Cambridge History of Medieval Political Thought c.350–c.1450,  and The New Cambridge Medieval History.

Personal life
Dunbabin is married to John Dunbabin.

Selected publications
France in the Making, 843-1180, Oxford University Press, Oxford, 1985. (2nd ed. 2000)
"Government", in Cambridge History of Medieval Political Thought, c. 350 - c.1450, Cambridge University Press, Cambridge, 1988, pp. 477 – 519. 
A Hound of God. Pierre de la Palud and the Fourteenth-Century Church, Oxford University Press, Oxford, 1991. 
Charles I of Anjou: Power, Kingship and State-Making in Thirteenth-Century Europe, 1998. (Medieval World Series)
Captivity and Imprisonment in Medieval Europe, 1000 - 1300, Palgrave Macmillan, Basingstoke and New York, 2002. 
"The household and entourage of Charles I of Anjou, king of the Regno, 1266-85", Historical Research, 77 (197), 2004, pp. 313–336.
The French in the Kingdom of Sicily, 1266-1305, Cambridge University Press, Cambridge, 2011.

References

Sources 
 .
 .

1939 births
Living people
Historians of France
Fellows of the British Academy
Historians of philosophy
British women non-fiction writers
Fellows of St Anne's College, Oxford